Železná Breznica ( or Vasberzence): is a village and municipality of the Zvolen District in the Banská Bystrica Region of Slovakia. It has around 497 inhabitants.

History
The village was mentioned for the first time in written records in 1420.

References

Villages and municipalities in Zvolen District